Marco Banchini (born 23 September 1980) is an Italian football manager, currently in charge as head coach of  club Montevarchi.

Career
Banchini started his managerial career with Vigevano. After that, he coached Amicale. In 2018, he was appointed head coach of Como 1907 in the Italian Serie C.

On 1 December 2020 Como sacked him after the match against Piacenza.

On 24 May 2021 he was hired by Serie C club Vis Pesaro.

On 6 December 2022, Banchini returned into management as the new head coach of Serie C club Montevarchi.

References

External links 
 The travels of...Mister Banchini: "Football in Oceania, now a new adventure in Albania and the culture of the quadrat. I'll tell you..." 
 The return of Banchini «Vanuatu goodbye seeks me the LegaPro» 
 Bankini: Superior, like the ‘big’ matches of Serie B 
 EXCLUSIVE FOL - Banchini: "I cosmopolitan coach who is inspired by Bielsa. In Siena we will play with your face open"

1980 births
People from Vigevano
Living people
Italian football managers
Vigevano Calcio managers
KF Teuta Durrës managers
Qormi F.C. managers
Como 1907 managers
Serie C managers
Italian expatriate football managers
Expatriate football managers in Albania
Expatriate football managers in Vanuatu
Expatriate football managers in Malta
Sportspeople from the Province of Pavia